Grit & Grind is the seventh studio album by American rapper E-40. The album was released July 9, 2002, by Jive Records and Sick Wid It Records.

Track listing

Charts

References

E-40 albums
2002 albums
Albums produced by Rick Rock
Jive Records albums
Sick Wid It Records albums
Albums produced by Lil Jon
Albums produced by Mike Dean (record producer)
Albums produced by Bosko